Hancock Park is a city park in the Miracle Mile section of the Mid-Wilshire neighborhood in Los Angeles, California.

The park's destinations include the La Brea Tar Pits; the adjacent George C. Page Museum of La Brea Discoveries, which displays the fossils of Ice Age prehistoric mammals from the tar pits; and the Los Angeles County Museum of Art (LACMA) complex.  They are among the most popular tourist attractions in Los Angeles.

Features
The park has urban open spaces and landscaped areas for walking, picnicking, and other recreation. Located on Wilshire Boulevard just east of Fairfax Avenue, it extends across a large city block and around two museums. The landmark Park La Brea complex is across 6th Street on the north.

Hancock Park is the location of the La Brea Tar Pits, the George C. Page Museum of La Brea Discoveries overseen by the Natural History Museum of Los Angeles County, and the Los Angeles County Museum of Art (LACMA) campus of buildings and sculpture gardens.

The 1952 Mid-century modern style Observation Pit in the park, a repository for large Ice Age fossils from throughout the tar pit area, reopened in 2014 after being closed since the mid-1990s. It is part of the Page Museum's new Excavator Tour.  The Pit 91 fossil excavation, also reopened in 2014 for excavations and public viewing, had closed in 2006 to focus on fossils newly uncovered during excavation for LACMA's new subterranean parking garage in the park's western area. The skeleton of a near-complete Columbian mammoth was among the excavated discoveries there.

The Pleistocene Garden recreates the original prehistoric landscape habitats in the Hancock Park area, representing the native vegetation of the Los Angeles Basin 10,000 to 40,000 years ago. The plant list was created from 35 years of research in the Pit 91 fossil excavation. It represents four ecoregions, Coastal sage scrub, Riparian, Deep Canyon California oak woodlands, and California montane chaparral.

History

Hancock Park was created in 1924 when George Allan Hancock donated  of the Hancock Ranch to the County of Los Angeles with the stipulation that the park be preserved and the fossils properly exhibited.

The park is named for its benefactor, George Hancock, a California petroleum industry pioneer, who recognized the scientific importance of the fossils found in the asphaltic deposits.

Until 1875, bones found in the asphalt deposits were considered remains of domestic stock and native mammals of the region. In that year scientist William Denton published the first mention of the occurrence of extinct fauna at Rancho La Brea.

It was not until 1901 that the bones on the Hancock Ranch were thoroughly studied by William Warren Orcutt, a prominent Los Angeles geologist and petroleum pioneer. who examined bones he personally collected. Orcutt collected bones of saber-toothed cat, dire wolf, ground sloth and other fossils from the site, bringing the attention of the scientific community to the value of the La Brea Tarpits in understanding the late Pleistocene fauna and flora of North America. Orcutt eventually donated his fossil collection to John Campbell Merriam of the University of California.

The park is registered as California Historical Landmark #170. The La Brea Tar Pits are a designated U.S. National Natural Landmark.

The park is to receive a renovation and makeover. A design was chosen in 2019 designed by Weiss/Manfredi.

California Historical Landmark Marker
California Historical Landmark Marker NO. 170 at the site reads:
NO. 170 HANCOCK PARK LA BREA - The bones of thousands of prehistoric animals that had been entrapped during the Ice Age in pools of tar that bubbled from beneath the ground were exhumed from this site. First historic reference to the pools, part of the 1840 Rancho La Brea land grant, was recorded by Gaspar de Portolá in 1769 - first scientific excavations were made by the University of California in 1906. The site was presented to the County of Los Angeles in 1916 by Captain G. Allan Hancock to be developed as a scientific monument.

See also

 List of fossil species in the La Brea Tar Pits
 California Historical Landmarks in Los Angeles County, California
 Lagerstätte – fossil formations.
 Ranchos of Los Angeles County, California – Spanish & Mexican land grant ranchos.

References

External links

 Official George C. Page Museum at the La Brea Tar Pits in Hancock Park website
 Arcadia Publishing: Historical Photos & Images of Los Angeles's La Brea Tar Pits and Hancock Park (book)

Parks in Los Angeles
Fossil parks in the United States
Mid-Wilshire, Los Angeles
California Historical Landmarks
National Natural Landmarks in California
Paleontology in California
Protected areas established in 1924
1924 establishments in California